Yankee Doodle in Berlin is a 1919 American silent comedy and World War I propaganda film from producer Mack Sennett. It was Sennett's most expensive production up to that time. Hiram Abrams was the original State's Rights marketer before the film's release, but producer Sol Lesser bought the rights in March 1919.

Bothwell Browne was a famous cross-dresser from Northern Europe. At the time this movie was produced he was the European rival of famous American cross-dresser Julian Eltinge, who starred in very similar plotted World War I propaganda film The Isle of Love (original title Over the Rhine).

The film was later condensed for rerelease and titled The Kaiser's Last Squeal.

The film is preserved by the Library of Congress. Copies also held by Museum of Modern Art, BFI Film and Television, Cinematheque Royale de Belgique, Academy Film Archive Bev. Hills.

Plot
Captain Bob White, an American aviator behind enemy lines, disguises himself as a woman in order to fool and steal an important map from the members of the German High Command, including the Kaiser himself.

Cast

References

External links

Yankee Doodle in Berlin available for free download at Internet Archive

1919 films
1919 comedy films
Silent American comedy films
American silent feature films
American World War I propaganda films
American black-and-white films
Cross-dressing in American films
Films directed by F. Richard Jones
Cultural depictions of Wilhelm II
Surviving American silent films
1910s American films
Silent war comedy films
1910s war comedy films